Legado is the third album in Spanish by Australian contemporary worship band Planetshakers. Legado was re-recorded in Spanish from the Legacy album. Unlike the album in English, Legado features one songs not featured on original album. Planetshakers Ministries International and Integrity Music released the album on 24 November 2017. They worked with Joth Hunt in the production of this album.

Content
Volver A Vivir is a track-by-track re-recording of Alive Again, performed in the Spanish language. Russell Evans describes "There's an atmosphere that electrifies your spirit when you come together with the people of God to put action to faith, and that's always been the hallmark of every recording we've done." Legado is the group's third album in Spanish, following in the footsteps of the Dove Award-nominated recordings, Sé Quién Eres Tú and Nada Es Imposible. This album is produced by Joth Hunt. Legado includes songs including: Pasión, Declaro Vida, ¡Profetizar! and Me Llamas Hermosa with worship leaders Joth Hunt, Rudy Nikkerud and Sam Evans.

Release and promotion
The band Planetshakers on November 17, 2017 released their new single ¡Profetizar! on the radio. The song was written by Planetshakers drummer Andy Harrison, the song is a bold statement of the authority God has given each of His Children to declare His Word and see the world transformed. "My prayer for this song is that listening to it, and particularly singing it, these words inspire you to begin to prophesy about your situations, about your destiny, about your health or whatever situation you are going through. God has not called us to be victims of those things ... I want to encourage you to get up with the Word of God in your mouth. Take the authority that God has given you, start to testify about those situations and see how they change", says Harrison. Planetshakers through their social networks announced the launch of their album in Spanish on November 24, 2017. In the video posted on Facebook, Lucía Parker, a Christian worship leader Salvadoran, appears rehearsing songs in Spanish with members of the Planetshakers band.

Critical reception

A staff editor at Amazon.com gave the album a relatively positive review, writing, "Planetshakers celebrates its 20th anniversary with Legado, a collection of new songs that capture the freedom of worship and the power of encounter."

Track listing

NOTE:  These songs are Spanish-language translations of Planetshakers songs in English.  The original English-language song is listed next to each title.

Personnel
Adapted from AllMusic.

 Planetshakers – primary artist
 Joth Hunt – Worship leader, guitar, mixing, composer, producer, cover design, project coordinator
 Samantha Evans – Worship leader, composer, cover design
 Rudy Nikkerud – Worship leader, guitar Acoustic
 Chelsi Nikkerud – Worship leader
 Juan Muñoz – vocals
 Lucía Parker – vocals
 Brian "BJ" Pridham – guitar, composer
 Andy Harrison – drums, composer
 Mitch Wong – keyboards, composer
 Josh Ham – Bass
 Scott Lim – keyboards
 Zach Kellock – guitar
 Matthew Gray – Mastering
 Joshua Brown	– A&R, Artist development
 Adrian Thompson – A&R, Artist development
 Timothy Chew	– artwork design, cover design
 Jennifer Bourke – project coordinator
 Jonathan Brown – executive producer
 Russell Evans – executive producer

References

2017 albums
Spanish-language albums
Planetshakers albums
Christian music albums by Australian artists